Montagne-Fayel is a commune in the Somme department in Hauts-de-France in northern France.

Geography

Population

Places of interest
 The red-brick church
 The war memorial

See also
Communes of the Somme department

References

Communes of Somme (department)